Karl John Langdon (born 28 March 1968) is a sports commentator and radio personality in Western Australia and a former Australian rules footballer with the Subiaco Football Club and the West Coast Eagles.

Early life 
Langdon began his sport career at Guildford Grammar School, an Anglican boys' school in Perth, Western Australia. During his school years he was an outstanding sportsman, captaining the school's football, cricket and athletics teams, the first student in its history to do so. In 1985 he won the Guildford Sportsman of the Year award.
Langdon was a talented cricketer and was selected in the Under 16 Australian team> He also represented Western Australia at Under 16 and Under 19 level and attended the Western Australia Institute of Sport. Whilst working as a bank teller, his bank was the subject of an armed robbery by Brenden James Abbott (the postcard bandit).

Australian rules football career 
In 1985, Langdon began his football career, joining the West Australian Football League's Subiaco Football Club. He played in Subiaco's 1986 premiership side in only his fourth league game after starting the season in the colts. At the end of the 1987 season, after playing in a losing grand final against Claremont, in the WAFL, he was drafted by the West Coast Eagles in the Australian Football League and debuted in 1988. Nicknamed "Boris", he was a flamboyant half-forward who was naturally red-headed but bleached his hair during his playing days. Langdon played 100 games with the West Coast Eagles and played in their first ever premiership side in 1992. A knee injury the following year sidelined him for the entire 1993 season. He also made several appearances at the AFL Tribunal due to his aggressive style of play.

Langdon represented Western Australia in State of Origin games as a centre half-forward. He represented the state for the first time in the bicentennial carnival in Adelaide in 1988 and retired from the AFL after 100 games and 108 goals with the Eagles.

Media career 
In 1996 Langdon retired from football and became a football and cricket commentator for Perth radio station 6PR. He currently hosts the station's sports program, Sportsday, with Mark Readings. He also has a fishing show on 6PR 5-6am on Saturdays. He is columnist for the Sunday Times, calls Speedway at the Perth Motorplex and has been the master of ceremonies at West Coast Eagles home games since retiring.

References

External links

1968 births
Living people
Australian rules football commentators
People from Perth, Western Australia
Subiaco Football Club players
West Coast Eagles players
West Coast Eagles Premiership players
Western Australian State of Origin players
People educated at Guildford Grammar School
Australian rules footballers from Western Australia
One-time VFL/AFL Premiership players